A number of ships were named Yewforest, including:

 , a British coaster in service 1926–42
 , a British coaster in service 1946–54
 , a British coaster in service 1957–85

Ship names